The 2019–20 Iranian Futsal Super League is the 21st season of the Iran Pro League and the 16th under the name Futsal Super League. Mes Sungun are the defending champions. The season will feature 12 teams from the 2018–19 Super League and two new teams promoted from the 2018–19 Iran Futsal's 1st Division, Shahin and Hyper Shahr.

Teams

Stadia, locations and Personnel

Number of teams by region

League table 

</noinclude><noinclude>

Results

Positions by round

Championship Playoffs

Calendar

Bracket

Awards 

 Winner: Mes Sungun
 Runners-up: Giti Pasand
 Third-Place: Setaregan
 Top scorer: Mahdi Javid (Mes Sungun) (34 goals) 
 Best Player: 
 Best Manager: 
 Best Goal Keeper: 
 Best Team: 
 Fairplay Man: 
 Best Referee:

References

External links 
 Iran Futsal League on PersianLeague 
 Futsal Planet 
 Iranian Futsal News Agency 

Iranian Futsal Super League seasons
1